Barend or (somewhat dated spelling) Barent is a Dutch male given name and occasional middle name. As of 2014, there are over 4,000 men in the Netherlands with this as their first name, and nearly 3,000 with it as their middle name. It was likely derived from Bernard. Notable people with the name include:

 Barent Avercamp (1612–1679), Dutch painter
 Barend Biesheuvel (1920–2001), Dutch politician
 Barend Bonneveld (1887–1978), Dutch Olympic wrestler
 Barent Fabritius (1624–1673), Dutch painter
 Barent Gael (c. 1630–1698), Dutch painter
 Barent Gardenier (1776–1822), American lawyer and politician
 Barend Graat (1628–1709), Dutch painter
 Barent van Kalraet (1649–1737), Dutch painter
 Barend van der Meer (1659–1700), Dutch painter
 Barent Momma (1897–1936), Dutch modern pentathlete
 Barend Mons (born 1957), Dutch biologist
 Barend Pieterse (born 1979), South African former rugby player
 Barend van Someren (1572–1632), Dutch painter
 Barent Staats (1796–?), American politician

References

Dutch masculine given names